Basic Concepts in Sociology is a book written by Maximilian Weber, a German economist and sociologist. The original edition was published in 1922 in German as Soziologische Grundbegriffe, but various translations to English exist. The first known of these was written in 1962.

This is part of a monumental work that was interrupted by Weber's death. He attempted to summarize all important concepts of sociology in that part.

See also
The Three Types of Legitimate Rule (discussion of concepts from the chapter "Bases of Legitimate Order")

References

External links
 Basic Concepts in Sociology, online ebook.

1922 non-fiction books
Sociology books
Works by Max Weber